Albert Ely Edwards (March 19, 1937 – April 29, 2020) was an American politician who served in the Texas Legislature representing District 146. He is best known as the principal proponent of the Juneteenth Texas state holiday, approved in 2007, which in 2021 became a federal holiday. Edwards served on three of the most influential Committees, including Chairman of the Rules and Resolutions Committee, Chairman of Budget and Oversight of the Ways and Means Committee and a member of the Appropriations Committee.

Biography

Life
Edwards was a native Houstonian. He was the sixth child out of the sixteen children born into the union of Reverend E. L. Edwards Sr. and Josephine Radford Edwards.

Edwards graduated from Wheatley High School in Houston.  Edwards is a member of Alpha Phi Alpha fraternity.

He received a bachelor's degree from Texas Southern University, Houston, Texas in 1966, a Certificate in Corrective Therapy at Tuskegee Institute in Alabama. He became a realtor and mortgage broker.

Career
He was involved in the Civil Rights Movement, where he participated in peaceful marches and demonstrations throughout the United States of America with Dr. Martin Luther King Jr., Reverend Jesse Jackson, Mr. Carl Stocks, Reverend William (Bill) Lawson, and others.

Edwards was a thirteen-term elected member of the Texas House of Representative, serving in that capacity from 1978 to 2007. In 1979, he authored and sponsored House Bill 1016, making June 19 ("Juneteenth") a state paid holiday in Texas. He founded Juneteenth, U.S.A., in 1979 along with Al Edwards Real Estate and Mortgage Company. The Juneteenth legislation finally passed in 2007.

1980s
He served as a member of the board of Push International Trade Bureau of Chicago, Illinois from 1983 to 1989. Al Edwards served as the State Chairman for Reverend Jesse Jackson's campaign for President of the United States in both 1984 and 1988.

In 1986, he founded "Operation Justus ", a community-based organization that serves as a referral service for persons with social problems and concerns. 
In 1987, he was arrested in Houston and went to jail for peacefully demonstrating against apartheid in South Africa. Others demonstrating on the national level included Reverend Jesse Jackson, Dick Gregory, Aretha Franklin, Harry Belafonte along with many others. 
In 1989, he traveled to Mozambique, Johannesburg, and Angola, South Africa on a peace-seeking mission.

1990s
Representative Edwards served as Chairman of the Texas Legislative Black Caucus from 1991 to 1997. 
Al Edwards was called to ministry in April 1993. Revered Al Edwards is a member of Progressive New Hope Church.

During the Clinton administration, Al Edwards was often invited to the White House as the guest of Bill and Hillary Clinton.  In May 1994, he was inducted into the Hall of Fame of the African American Biographic Association in Atlanta, Georgia.  Al Edwards was elected Chairman of the Democratic National Committee Black Caucus and held that position for six years. He was Vice-Chairman for ten years.

Edwards received his Doctorate of Divinity from World Bible Christian University in San Antonio. In 1999, Edwards was appointed Chairman of Texas Emancipation Juneteenth Cultural and Historical Commission by Governor George W. Bush.

2004
On January 15, 2004, Al Edwards helped to lead a successful march of over 5000 people in Waller County in order for the students of Prairie View A & M University to be able to vote. As a senior member of the State Legislature, Al Edwards served on three of the most influential Committees. He was the Chairman of the Rules and Resolutions Committee, Chairman of Budget and Oversight of the Ways and Means Committee and a member of the Appropriations Committee.

Awards
He was inducted into "Who's Who in America " in 1989 and "Who's Who of Global Decision Makers" in 2006. In 1983, he received an honorary doctoral degree from the University of Belize. Edwards is memorialized with a statute near Ashton Villa in Galveston, depicting him holding up a copy of the Juneteenth legislation.

Death
Edwards died from natural causes on April 29, 2020 at age 83.

References

1937 births
2020 deaths
Businesspeople from Houston
Tuskegee University alumni
Texas Southern University alumni
20th-century American politicians
21st-century American politicians
African-American state legislators in Texas
Democratic Party members of the Texas House of Representatives
Politicians from Houston
20th-century African-American politicians
African-American men in politics
21st-century African-American politicians